Lisa Aitken (born 16 February 1990 in Dundee) is a professional squash player who represents Scotland. She reached a career-high world ranking of World No. 35 in October 2019.

Personal life
Aitken is engaged to Scotland football captain Rachel Corsie.

References

External links

Scottish female squash players
Scottish LGBT sportspeople
LGBT squash players
Living people
1990 births
Sportspeople from Dundee